ST43 is the name for a Romanian diesel locomotive, produced by Electroputere, exported to and operating in Poland. It was made for the purpose of heavy transport.

History
In the early 1960s a need appeared in Poland for urgent introduction of locos able to haul heavy freight. This was caused mainly by the intensification of transport on south-north line, especially from the Silesian coal mines to Szczecin and Świnoujście harbours. Lack of experience in building diesel locos for that purpose was the reason why the first ones had to be bought from Romania.

Introduction
In March 1965 first 30 items of 060DA locomotives (factory number of ST43) were introduced into Poznań and Szczecin, according to agreement with Romanian producer. Good results of tests allowed next deliveries to be brought to Poland. Until 1978 a total number of 422 locomotives were operating in Poland.

Production

Present days
In the 1990s, the ST43 appeared to be no longer necessary as most of the tracks serviced by it were electrified. Most of the units were withdrawn, the rest were sent for use on passenger and light transport trains.

Locomotive assignment

Nicknames
This loco used to be called by the following names:
Rumun (en. Romanian) - from the country of origin.

See also
Polish locomotives designation

External links

Modern Locos Gallery
Rail Service
Chabówka Rail Museum

Railway locomotives introduced in 1965
Diesel-electric locomotives of Poland
Co′Co′ locomotives
Electroputere locomotives
Standard gauge locomotives of Poland